Alex Alves Cardoso (born 25 August 1992), known as Alex Alves, is a Brazilian footballer who plays for Coritiba. Mainly a central defender, he can also play as a defensive midfielder.

Club career
Born in Assis Chateaubriand, Paraná, Alex Alves graduated with Paraná Clube's youth setup. He made his professional debut on 19 May 2012, starting in a 1–1 home draw against Guarani for the Série B championship.

Alex Alves scored his first goal in the competition on 7 July, netting the first in a 2–0 home win against Boa Esporte. He finished the season with 32 appearances and four goals, as his side finished tenth.

On 7 February 2014, after being an ever-present figure for the Azulão, Alex Alves signed a three-year deal with Goiás. He made his Série A debut on 4 May, playing the full 90 minutes in a 1–0 away win against Atlético Mineiro.

Alex Alves scored his first goal in the main category of Brazilian football on 23 May 2014, netting his team's first in a 2–2 home draw against Santos.

References

External links
Alex Alves at playmakerstats.com (English version of ogol.com.br)

1992 births
Living people
Sportspeople from Paraná (state)
Brazilian footballers
Association football defenders
Association football midfielders
Campeonato Brasileiro Série A players
Campeonato Brasileiro Série B players
Paraná Clube players
Goiás Esporte Clube players